The Edict of Serdica, also called Edict of Toleration by Galerius, was issued in 311 in Serdica (now Sofia, Bulgaria) by Roman Emperor Galerius. It officially ended the Diocletianic Persecution of Christianity in the Eastern Roman Empire.

The Edict implicitly granted Christianity the status of religio licita, a worship that was recognized and accepted by the Roman Empire. It was the first edict legalizing Christianity and preceded the Edict of Milan by two years.

History
On 23 February 303, on the Terminalia feast, Emperor Diocletian, on the proposal of Galerius, issued a persecutory edict. The edict prescribed:
 Destroying churches and burning the Holy Scriptures
 Confiscation of church property
 Banning Christians from undertaking collective legal action
 Loss of privileges for Christians of high rank who refused to recant
 Arresting some state officials.

In 305, Diocletian abdicated and was replaced by Galerius, his successor, who continued persecution in the East until 311, when he granted Christians forgiveness, freedom of worship and (implicitly) the status of religio licita.

Full text
Promulgated in the name of the other official members of the Tetrarchy, the edict marked the end of persecutions against the Christians.

References

310s in the Roman Empire
311
4th century in law
4th-century Christianity
Constantinian dynasty
Edicts of toleration
Galerius
Roman law
Diocletianic Persecution